Searle, Gardner and Company Cuff and Collar Factory, also known as the Marshall Ray Building, is a historic textile factory located at Troy, Rensselaer County, New York. It was built about 1898–1899, and consists of a five-story, 18 bay wide, rectangular, main block with an attached two-story block.  It features segmental arched windows and Romanesque Revival style design elements. The building housed a collar and cuff, and later shirt, manufacturing plant into the mid-1900s.

It was listed on the National Register of Historic Places in 2014.

References

Industrial buildings and structures on the National Register of Historic Places in New York (state)
Romanesque Revival architecture in New York (state)
Industrial buildings completed in 1899
Buildings and structures in Troy, New York
National Register of Historic Places in Troy, New York
Textile mills in New York (state)